Q'ullq'uni (Aymara q'ullq'u narrowness, strait, narrow pass, -ni a suffix to indicate ownership, "the one with a strait", also spelled Khullkuni) is a   mountain in the Chilla-Kimsa Chata mountain range in the Andes of Bolivia. It is situated in the La Paz Department, Ingavi Province, Jesús de Machaca Municipality, north-east of Ch'ama (Chama). Q'ullq'uni lies north-west of the mountain Wisk'achani, north-east of the mountain Jisk'a Sallalla and east of the mountains Pukara and Wila Qullu.

References 

Mountains of La Paz Department (Bolivia)